The Chréa National Park (Arabic:الحديقة الوطنية الشريعة) is one of the largest national parks of Algeria. It is located in Blida Province, named after Chréa, a town near this park. The park, located in a mountainous area known as the Blidean Atlas (which is part of the Tell Atlas) includes the ski station of Chréa, one of the few ski stations in Africa where skiing can be done on natural snow, and the grotto of Chiffa.

Founded in 1997, it covers an area of 36,985 hectares.

The national park is home to over 1240 plant and animal species, such as the Atlas cedar (Cedrus atlantica) and the monkey (Macaca sylvanus).

Natural features
The Chréa National Park is home to a varied flora and fauna. Its ancient Atlas cedar forests is habitat for a population of the endangered Barbary macaque. This national park has one of the few such habitat areas in Algeria that support a sub-population of the Barbary macaque, Macaca sylvanus.

References
C. Michael Hogan (2008) Barbary Macaque: Macaca sylvanus, Globaltwitcher.com, ed. Nicklas Stromberg

External links
 A website with information about the park
Chréa National Park on LexiOrient travel guide
Park data on UNEP-WPMC
Chréa National Park by Drone

Line notes

National parks of Algeria
Biosphere reserves of Algeria
Geography of Blida Province
Protected areas established in 1985
Tourist attractions in Blida Province
1985 establishments in Algeria